"Take a Look" is a single released in 1988 by British band Level 42 from the album Staring at the Sun.  It reached number 32 on the UK Singles Chart.

Personnel
Mark King - Bass/Vocals
Mike Lindup - Keyboards/Vocals
Gary Husband - Drums
Alan Murphy - Guitar
Wally Badarou - Keyboards
Dominic Miller - Guitar

References

Level 42 songs
Songs written by Mark King (musician)
1988 singles
1988 songs
Songs written by Mike Lindup
Songs written by Wally Badarou
Songs written by Phil Gould (musician)